Yagnik is an Indian surname that may refer to
Alka Yagnik (born 1966), Indian playback singer 
Amrutlal Yagnik, 20th century Indian Gujarati critic, biographer, essayist, editor and translator
Gangabai Yagnik (1868–1937), Indian Gujarati writer
Dishant Yagnik (born 1983), Indian cricketer 
Indulal Yagnik (1892–1972), Indian independence activist
Krishnadev Yagnik (born 1984), Indian film director and screenwriter